Florida's Natural Growers is an agricultural cooperative based in Lake Wales, Florida.  It is currently owned by over 1,100 grower members. It was the only national orange juice maker that used only US-grown fruit (grown by its cooperative members in Florida) in its products;  however, this policy changed starting in May 2022.  After that time, Florida's Natural products included concentrated orange juice from Mexico.

History
Florida's Natural Growers was founded in 1933 as Florida Citrus Canners Cooperative. Its initial operations included canning juice and grapefruit sections for its members, and in 1938 began extracting juice with automated machines.  During World War II, the company produced concentrated orange juice for the military; after the war, 80% of the juice the company produced was in frozen concentrate form to meet consumer demand for the relatively new, convenient form.

In the 1960s, consumer demand shifted to ready-to-drink orange juice, and frozen concentrate sales declined while demand for chilled juices increased.  In 1969, the cooperative took the name Citrus World and adopted the current name, Florida's Natural Growers, in 1998.  It is currently composed of 12 representatives of 14 citrus cooperatives: Waverly Growers Cooperative, Lake Placid Cooperative, Ben Hill Griffin Inc., Haines City Citrus Growers Association, Orange Growers Marketing Association, Lake Wales Citrus Growers Association, Hunt Brothers Cooperative, Citrus Marketing Services Inc, Peace River Packing Company, Dundee Citrus Growers Association, Winter Haven Citrus Growers Association, and Umatilla Citrus Growers Association, Southern Gardens Citrus Growers, and Lykes.

In 2001, the company opened the "Grove House", a visitor's center across the street from its Lake Wales, Florida processing plant.  The Grove House is open Monday through Friday 10 am to 5 pm, and is closed from Memorial Day through the last day of September.

Products and marketing

Florida's Natural produces citrus juices (mainly orange juice and lemonades) under the Florida's Natural, Coral Reef Juice Co. and Donald Duck brand names. 

The company's primary marketing strategy is to differentiate itself from main competitors Simply Orange, Minute Maid and Tropicana. It does this by emphasizing its cooperative organization ("Florida's Natural. Together, from Tree to Table"). By comparison, Simply Orange and Minute Maid are both owned by Coca-Cola, while Tropicana is owned in a joint venture by French private equity firm, PAI Partners with PepsiCo keeping a 39% non-controlling stake. As a citrus cooperative, Florida's Natural uses citrus grown by its cooperative members in Central and South Florida in its products (as well as concentrated citrus juice from Mexico), and seeks to provide the maximum return for fruit to its members, supporting these citrus growers and their families.

References

External links
Florida's Natural
Disney-branded juice drinks

1933 establishments in Florida
Juice brands
Agricultural marketing cooperatives
Companies based in Polk County, Florida
Lake Wales, Florida
Organizations established in 1933
Agricultural cooperatives in the United States
Citrus industry in Florida